The Krabi River is a river in Southern Thailand. The Krabi river is 5 kilometres long, as it is the main channel within a larger estuary to the Andaman Sea. The other two main channels are the Yuan River to the south and Chi Lat to the west. The 31 km upper stretch of the river are named Khlong Krabi Yai, which originates at the Phanom mountain.

The estuary of the Krabi river is listed as Ramsar wetland number 1100 since July 5 2001. The protected area of 213 km² covers more than 100 km² of mangrove forests and 12 km² of up to 2 km wide tidal mudflats. The area is popular with birdwatchers coming to spot some of the most diverse and rare species in the world, the masked finfoot and the brown-winged kingfisher to name just a few.

The town - Krabi has a reputation for its tourism. It is situated along the seaboard of the Andaman Sea. This town gave the Krabi river its name.

External links
Krabi River estuary description
thaibirding.com on Krabi River

Rivers of Thailand
Geography of Krabi province
Ramsar sites in Thailand